William E. Miller (1914–1983) was an American politician who served in the United States House of Representatives.

William E. Miller may also refer to:

William Ernest Miller (1908–1976), United States Federal Judge
William E. Miller (soldier, born 1836), American soldier and politician, Medal of Honor recipient
William E. Miller (Iowa judge), justice of the Iowa Supreme Court

See also
William Miller (disambiguation)